Gymnopilus microloxus is a species of mushroom in the family Hymenogastraceae.

See also

List of Gymnopilus species

External links
Gymnopilus microloxus at Index Fungorum

microloxus
Fungi of North America